Colombia competed at the 2015 Parapan American Games held in Toronto, Canada.

Medalists

Athletics

Cycling

Judo

Swimming

Table tennis

Wheelchair rugby 

Colombia won the bronze medal in the wheelchair rugby tournament.

Wheelchair tennis

References 

2015 in Colombian sport
Nations at the 2015 Parapan American Games